I Am What I Am is a 2021 Chinese computer-animated comedy-drama film directed by Sun Haipeng.

Plot 

A young Chinese lacking self confidence must overcome doubt in order to compete in the Guangzhou lion dance championship.

Controversy 

A trailer for I Am What I Am attracted controversy on Weibo for being offensive due to the perceived exaggerated slanted eyes of the Chinese characters. Producer Zhang Miao defended the character design as aesthetic confidence as opposed to a traditional Western design of Asian characters in animation.

Reception 

The movie was widely praised despite its modest box office takings.

References

External links 

 

2020s Mandarin-language films
2021 animated films
2021 films
2021 independent films
Chinese animated films